Ruby Mace (born 5 September 2003) is an English professional footballer who plays as a midfielder and defender for Women's Super League club Leicester City on loan from Manchester City and represented the England national team at youth levels. She has previously played for Birmingham City and Arsenal.

Early life
Raised in Upminster, Essex, in the London Borough of Havering, Mace is the youngest of three and attended Coopers' Company and Coborn School. At age 14, she switched to Woodlands in Basildon and an elite development programme. The England Football Association nominated Mace to receive Sports Aid funding, and she received £1,000 football-related costs.

Club career

Arsenal 
Mace made her Arsenal debut on 26 September 2020 against North London rivals Tottenham Hotspur in the FA Cup quarter final of 2019–20 season. The game was rescheduled due to the COVID-19 pandemic, Mace came on in the 88th minute to replace captain Kim Little as Arsenal won 4–0. Days later on 7 October 2020 Mace once again made a substitute appearance for Arsenal this time against Chelsea in the Continental Cup replacing Caitlin Foord in the 84th minute. Mace appeared in the WSL for the first time against Brighton & Hove Albion on 11 October 2020 coming on as a second-half substitute replacing Caitiln Foord in the 78th Minute, Mace made her second league appearance against Tottenham Hotspur on 18 October 2020 again coming on as a second-half substitute this time replacing Danielle van de Donk in the 77th minute. Mace made her second Continental Cup appearance of the season against London City Lionesses coming on in the 46th minute replacing Jill Roord a game in which Arsenal would go on to win 4–0.

Birmingham City (dual registration) 
On 2 February 2021 Birmingham City announced that Mace had joined them on loan for the rest of the 2020–21 WSL season.

Manchester City 
On 11 June 2021 it was announced that Mace had joined Manchester City signing her first professional contract with the club ahead of her 18th birthday. On 13 October 2021 Mace would make her debut in the league cup against Everton playing the full 90 minutes.

Leicester City (loan) 
On 28th January 2023, Mace Joined Leicester City on loan for the remainder of the 22/23 season. She made her debut for the club against Reading in the Women's FA Cup on 29 January 2023.

International career
On 24 October 2020, Mace made her under 17 national team debut captaining England in UEFA Women's U-17 Qualifiers against Bosnia and Herzegovina U17s in which England won 4–0, three days later on 27 October 2020 Mace scored her first goal for the under-17s against Belgium u-17s.

On 26 October 2021, Mace made her under 19 national team debut in UEFA Women's U-19 Qualifiers against Switzerland U19s in which England would win 1–0.

Career statistics

Club

Honours
Manchester City
 FA Women's League Cup: 2021–22

References

External links
 
 

2003 births
Living people
Women's Super League players
English women's footballers
Women's association football midfielders
Arsenal W.F.C. players
Footballers from Greater London
Birmingham City W.F.C. players
Manchester City W.F.C. players
England women's youth international footballers